Mike Anscombe is a Canadian broadcaster who appeared on the Global Television Network between 1974 and 1997 as a news anchor; most notably as one of the "Three Nice Guys" when he co-anchored Global's noon newscast with John Dawe and Bob McAdorey. He is a former host of CBC Sports Hockey Night in Canada games involving the Montreal Canadiens and currently the host of Leafs TV's Once a Leaf.

References

External links
 

Living people
Canadian television news anchors
Canadian television sportscasters
Year of birth missing (living people)
National Hockey League broadcasters
North American Soccer League (1968–1984) commentators
Place of birth missing (living people)
Toronto Maple Leafs announcers